St. Michael's Church in Fulda, Hesse, is considered to be the oldest replica of the Church of the Holy Sepulchre in Germany, built in the Carolingian architectural style (Pre-Romanesque) on behalf of abbot Eigil in the years (820822). It served as a burial chapel to Fulda monastery founded in 744, which was one of the prominent cultural centres of the early Middle Ages. St. Michael stands in the neighbourhood of Fulda cathedral, and the architect was probably the monk Racholf (d. 824). The rotunda and crypt remain preserved from this time. In the 10th and 11th century, the church was extended from the rotunda, and a west tower was built. In 1618 the roof over the rotunda was rebuilt with a conical roof, and in 17151716 a chapel was added to the north side. It was restored in 1853. Wall paintings in the interior date from the 11th century.

See also
 Saint Michael: Roman Catholic traditions and views
 History of medieval Arabic and Western European domes

References

 Taken from the German Wikipedia article: Michaelskirche (Fulda)
 Reference cited in Michaelskirche (Fulda):
 Die Michaelskirche zu Fulda. Kunstführer von Erwin Sturm (Hg.). 1997

Religious buildings and structures completed in 822
9th-century churches in Germany
Fulda
Fulda
Buildings and structures in Fulda (district)
9th-century establishments in Germany
Double chapels